Coșcodeni is a commune in Sîngerei District, Moldova. It is composed of three villages: Bobletici, Coșcodeni and Flămînzeni.

Notable people
 Grigore Baștan (1922–1983) 
 Stela Popa, journalist

References

Communes of Sîngerei District